William Bethule Peck (November 26, 1926 – April 22, 2017) was an American football player and coach. He served as the head football coach at Middle Tennessee State University from 1970 to 1974, compiling a record of 27–25–2.

Head coaching record

College

References

1926 births
2017 deaths
American football guards
Columbia Lions football coaches
Middle Tennessee Blue Raiders football coaches
Northern Illinois Huskies football coaches
Stetson Hatters football players
High school football coaches in Florida
High school football coaches in New Jersey
People from Hackensack, New Jersey
Sportspeople from Bergen County, New Jersey
Coaches of American football from New Jersey
Players of American football from New Jersey